Luis Chérrez (born 19 January 1968) is an Ecuadorian former footballer. He played in two matches for the Ecuador national football team from 1993 to 1994. He was also part of Ecuador's squad for the 1993 Copa América tournament.

References

External links
 

1968 births
Living people
Ecuadorian footballers
Ecuador international footballers
Place of birth missing (living people)
Association football midfielders
C.D. Técnico Universitario footballers
C.D. El Nacional footballers
S.D. Quito footballers
C.S.D. Macará footballers